Two ships of the Royal Navy have been named HMS King George V, after George V, King of the United Kingdom, whilst another was planned:
She was renamed  in 1910, prior to her launch in 1911. Captained by Lord Stanley.
  was a  battleship, originally to be named HMS Royal George, but renamed in 1910, before her launch in 1911. She was sold for scrapping in 1926, and was broken up in 1927.
  was a  battleship launched in 1939 and broken up in 1959.

Battle honours
Ships named King George V have earned the following battle honours:
 Jutland, 1916
 Dunkirk, 19401
 Atlantic, 1941
 Bismarck, 1941
 Arctic, 1942−43
 Sicily, 1943
 Okinawa, 1945
 Japan, 1945
1: Awarded to merchant vessel TS King George V

See also
 
 TS King George V - passenger steamer owned and operated by David MacBrayne Ltd, and used as a troop carrier during the Second World War.
 George V (disambiguation)

Royal Navy ship names